The Stromberg is a heavily forested hill ridge up to  in the northern part of the German state of Baden-Württemberg.

Literature 
 
 Karl Eduard Paulus: Beschreibung des Oberamts Brackenheim. Hrsg. von dem Königlichen statistisch-topographischen Bureau. H. Lindemann, Stuttgart 1873, Wikisource
 Karl Eduard Paulus: Beschreibung des Oberamts Vaihingen. Hrsg. von dem Königlichen statistisch-topographischen Bureau. Hallberger, Stuttgart 1856. Wikisource

References

External links 
 
 Map of the Stromberg at: 
 Website of the nature park with information on its geology
 Nature in the Stromberg

Regions of Baden-Württemberg
Natural regions of the Neckar and Tauber Gäu Plateaus